Mark Strome (born 20th century) is an American entrepreneur and philanthropist. He is the founder, chief investment officer and chairman of Strome Investment Management.

Early life and education
Born in New York, Strome grew up on his family's dairy farm in Warsaw, New York.  In 1974, he graduated from Warsaw High School.

Strome received a degree in civil engineering from Old Dominion University, and graduated with honors in 1978.  Thereafter, he studied economics at University of California, Berkeley receiving his MA with honors. 
Strome was awarded an honorary doctorate in 1998 from Old Dominion University. In 2014 the Old Dominion University School of Business was renamed the Strome School of Business.

Career
Following his academic success, Strome began his career in the investment management and the securities industry.  Initially one of the founding partners at Kayne Anderson, Strome founded Strome Investment Management, where he became a notable pioneer in the hedge fund industry. For more than two decades, Strome invested internationally with a global macroeconomic focus, achieving worldwide success.  Strome has additionally created and incubated numerous publicly traded companies and several successful significant private companies.  In recent years this has included the founding of Pulse Biosystems, 2017's most successful public offering. In 2017 he formed iWood Studios, to create original content for film and TV.

Philanthropy
The Strome Family Foundation was established in 1993 to support community programs addressing local needs to larger global issues, primarily in education, the arts and medical research.  His philanthropic investments are made with the same strategy and expectations as venture donors seeking measurable results. 
 
Strome donated $4 million to Johns Hopkins for hematological research in 2006.
 
In September 2014, the foundation pledged $11 million to endow the Strome Entrepreneurial Center at Old Dominion University, his alma mater, in support of a new, multi-pronged program to nurture business entrepreneurs.  The program encourages a formal way of linking mentors with promising students.

Strome continues to personally mentor emerging entrepreneurs.

Personal life
Strome has four sons and one daughter, and lives in los angeles. California

See also
 List of Old Dominion University alumni
 List of people from New York
 List of philanthropists
 List of University of California, Berkeley alumni

References

Year of birth missing (living people)
Place of birth missing (living people)
20th-century births
20th-century American businesspeople
21st-century American businesspeople
American chairpersons of corporations
American financial company founders
American hedge fund managers
Businesspeople from Los Angeles
Businesspeople from New York (state)
Corporate executives
Founders of charities
Old Dominion University alumni
Patrons of schools
People from Santa Monica, California
People from Wyoming County, New York
Philanthropists from California
University of California, Berkeley alumni
Living people
Philanthropists from New York (state)
Chief investment officers